Rolandina may refer to:

the surgical textbook of Roland of Parma (c. 1230)
a history of northern Italy by Rolandino of Padua (1276)